Plagodis phlogosaria, the scorched wing or straight-lined plagodis, is a species of moth of the  family Geometridae. It is found in all of North America except the far south and Yukon and Alaska.

The wingspan is 28–38 mm. The moth flies from April to August depending on the location.

The larvae feed on alder, basswood, birch, black cherry, chokecherry, hazel and willow.

Subspecies
The following subspecies are recognised:
Plagodis phlogosaria iris
Plagodis phlogosaria bowmanaria
Plagodis phlogosaria approximaria
Plagodis phlogosaria keutzingaria
Plagodis phlogosaria purpuraria Pearsall
Plagodis phlogosaria illinoiaria

External links
Bug Guide

Ourapterygini
Moths of North America